Nine Inch Nails is an American industrial rock band founded in 1988 by Trent Reznor in Cleveland, Ohio. The band's live performances contrast with its in-studio counterpart; although Reznor is in complete creative control of Nine Inch Nails in-studio, he typically assembles groups of backing musicians to interpret songs for live performances. The list below outlines the individuals that has been a part of the Nine Inch Nails live band, in addition to any commercially released material that they contributed to or appeared on.

Background
The band's lineup has changed consistently throughout the band's history, with Reznor remaining the only constant. Notable musicians who have contributed to live performances include Chris Vrenna, Richard Patrick, Jeff Ward, James Woolley, Danny Lohner, Robin Finck, Charlie Clouser, Jerome Dillon, Alessandro Cortini, Aaron North, Jeordie White, Josh Freese, Justin Meldal-Johnsen, and Ilan Rubin. In 2016, frequent Reznor collaborator and multi-instrumentalist Atticus Ross was announced as an official member of Nine Inch Nails, becoming the only person other than Reznor to have held an official position in the band. The configuration of Nine Inch Nails as a live band has evolved consistently. Early incarnations of the band featured three people playing guitar, drums, keyboards, and samplers. Later incarnations replaced the keyboards and samplers with an additional guitarist, and further incarnations added a bassist. The live component later settled on a five-piece band between the Self Destruct Tour in 1994 and Lights in the Sky Tour in 2008. In September 2007, Reznor expressed his interest in moving away from the "rock band configuration" to explore "other ways [to] present the material in concert", and by 2009 the live band was once again pared down to four positions. The live band reverted to five positions for the Twenty Thirteen Tour; however, on the second leg (Tension 2013), the live band consisted of the largest amount of members in the lineup with eight members total. Afterwards, the lineup again reverted to four positions for the third leg (NIN 2014). The live band then settled on five positions for 2017's I Can't Seem to Wake Up Tour, and has remained the same since.

Nine Inch Nails has released one album, one EP, and four videos featuring the live band: Closure (1997), a double-VHS set featuring live performances from the Self Destruct Tour which was later expanded in 2004 with extra content from 1988 to 1995; And All That Could Have Been (2002), released in CD and double-DVD formats featuring performances from the Fragility Tour; Beside You in Time (2007), released on Blu-Ray and DVD and featuring performances from the Live: With Teeth Tour; Another Version of the Truth (2009), an officially sanctioned fan-made release in HD and triple-DVD sets featuring performances from the Lights in the Sky Tour; and Live 2013 EP (2013), a four-track EP consisting of performances from the Twenty Thirteen Tour.

Between major tours, live band members have on occasion contributed instrumental performances to official Nine Inch Nails releases, though creative control and direction has always been the responsibility of Reznor; however, in 2020, when Nine Inch Nails was inducted into the Rock and Roll Hall of Fame, Reznor was inducted in addition to Ross, Finck, Cortini, Rubin, Vrenna, and Lohner as well.

Current members

Official members

Touring musicians

Former members

Abridged live musicians

Timeline

Line-ups

See also 
Nine Inch Nails live performances
List of Nine Inch Nails tours

Notes

References

 
Nine Inch Nails